Bourgueil is a commune in the Indre-et-Loire department in central France.

Population

Bourgueil wine

Bourgueil is an appellation d'origine contrôlée (AOC) for wine in the Loire Valley region, and produces primarily red wine from the grape variety Cabernet Franc. Bourgueil wine was mentioned in the works of François Rabelais.

Transportation
Bourgueil is served by the A85 autoroute, a nearby railway line and the cycling-route, Loire a vélo.

Personalities
Bourgueil was the birthplace of:
 Moses Amyraut (1596–1664), Protestant theologian and metaphysician
 Antoine Brutus Menier (1795–1853), chocolatier
 Jean Carmet (1920–1994), actor

In Acadian Genealogy, Bourgueil is notable as the birthplace of Guillaume Trahan.

See also
Loire Valley (wine)
Communes of the Indre-et-Loire department

References

External links

 Tourist office website (in French)
 Haut-de-la-Gardière

Communes of Indre-et-Loire
Anjou